Eglinton Park is a public park located in the North Toronto neighbourhood of Toronto, Ontario, Canada, a few blocks west of the Eglinton Subway Station. It is bounded on the south end by Eglinton Avenue West, on the north by Roselawn Aveunue. The other two sides of the park have houses backing onto the park; Oriole Parkway on the west side, and Edith Drive on the east.

The park has two baseball diamonds, soccer fields, a splash pool, and a kids playground. Outdoor tennis courts are turned into skating rinks in the winter. Also located in the park is the North Toronto Community Memorial Centre with an indoor pool, outdoor pool, water slides, gymnasium, walking track, and exercise rooms. There is also an indoor skating rink.

History 
 1885 James Pears purchases the site and opens the Pears Brickyards
 1926 the City purchased the site to create the "North Toronto Athletic Field"
 1929 the park was renamed to "Eglinton Park" after the 13th Earl of Eglinton of Ayrshire, Scotland
 1998 The Heritage Community Garden is created within the park

See also 
Eglinton Country Park, North Ayrshire, Scotland, also named after the 13th Earl of Eglinton

References 
 Lost Rivers website
 Hiking the GTA website

Parks in Toronto